Kamal Ahmed is the name of:

Kamal Ahmed (comedian) (born 1966), American comedian
Kamal Ahmed (journalist) (born 1967), British journalist
Kamal Ahmed (politician), Bahraini politician
Kamal Ahmed (singer) (born 1965), Bangladeshi singer
 Kamal Ahmed (director) (born 1935), Bangladeshi director
 Kamal Ahmed (music director) (born 1937), Pakistani music director

See also
Kamal Ahmed Majumder, Bangladeshi politician
Kamal Ahmed Rizvi, Pakistani actor and playwright
Kamal Ahmad, American lawyer